Gas is a city in Allen County, Kansas, United States.  As of the 2020 census, the population of the city was 475.  The city was named for the abundant natural gas that was found in the area.

History
When natural gas was discovered in Elm Township in the summer of 1898 E.K. Taylor sold  of his farm to some spelter companies and in October sub-divided the remainder into lots, which was the beginning of "Gas City". The place grew rapidly, the cheap fuel afforded by the immense supply of natural gas bringing in a number of large manufacturing plants of various kinds. In 1910 the population was 1,281, and the city had a bank, a daily and a weekly newspaper, an opera house, an international money order postoffice (first opened in August 1899) from which mail was distributed to the surrounding country by rural free delivery, several good mercantile houses, telegraph and express offices.

Geography
Gas is located at  (37.923851, -95.346168).  Situated along U.S. Route 54 in Elm Township, the city is about three miles (5 km) east of the city of Iola (the county seat) and 2½ miles west of the city of La Harpe.  The interchange between U.S. Routes 54 and 169 is about two miles (3 km) west of Gas.

Demographics

2010 census
As of the census of 2010, there were 564 people, 216 households, and 149 families residing in the city. The racial makeup of the city was 95.7% White, 0.4% African American, 1.6% Native American, 1.4% from other races, and 0.9% from two or more races. Hispanic or Latino of any race were 2.0% of the population.

There were 216 households, of which 33.3% had children under the age of 18 living with them, 56.0% were married couples living together, 9.7% had a female householder with no husband present, 3.2% had a male householder with no wife present, and 31.0% were non-families. 23.1% of all households were made up of individuals, and 13.9% had someone living alone who was 65 years of age or older. The average household size was 2.61 and the average family size was 3.03.

The median age in the city was 38.7 years. 27.7% of residents were under the age of 18; 7.1% were between the ages of 18 and 24; 21.2% were from 25 to 44; 28.1% were from 45 to 64; and 15.8% were 65 years of age or older. The gender makeup of the city was 50.7% male and 49.3% female.

2000 census
As of the census of 2000, there were 556 people, 217 households, and 167 families residing in the city. The racial makeup of the city was 94.60% White, 0.18% African American, 1.26% Native American, 0.72% Asian, 0.18% from other races, and 3.06% from two or more races. Hispanic or Latino of any race were 2.16% of the population.

There were 217 households, out of which 34.6% had children under the age of 18 living with them, 65.9% were married couples living together, 7.8% had a female householder with no husband present, and 22.6% were non-families. 20.7% of all households were made up of individuals, and 7.8% had someone living alone who was 65 years of age or older. The average household size was 2.56 and the average family size was 2.94.

In the city, the population was spread out, with 26.6% under the age of 18, 8.5% from 18 to 24, 29.0% from 25 to 44, 23.0% from 45 to 64, and 12.9% who were 65 years of age or older. The median age was 38 years. For every 100 females, there were 104.4 males. For every 100 females age 18 and over, there were 96.2 males.

The median income for a household in the city was $35,804, and the median income for a family was $38,942. Males had a median income of $25,104 versus $18,500 for females. The per capita income for the city was $14,012. About 9.4% of families and 12.4% of the population were below the poverty line, including 11.9% of those under age 18 and 10.9% of those age 65 or over.

References

Further reading

External links
 City of Gas
 Gas - Directory of Public Officials
 USD 257, local school district
 Gas city map, KDOT

Cities in Kansas
Cities in Allen County, Kansas
Populated places established in 1898
1898 establishments in Kansas